Bicker is a village in the Borough of Boston, Lincolnshire, England. The population of the village was 941 at the 2011 census.

History

The medieval estuary, Bicker Haven, which is now a village, took its name from the town of Bicker. It originally formed the outlet of the River Witham which diverted to Boston after a flood in 1014. When the Anglo-Saxon settlers enclosed the marsh for pasture, and the tide no longer reached the haven, it silted-up, whereby Bicker ceased to be a port and became a farming village. This process had already begun with the Donington branch of the haven.

The A52 previously ran through the village, but it is now bypassed to the south. The Bicker Bar roundabout is part of the Swineshead bypass which opened in 1985.

Geography
Bicker is one of 18 parishes which, together with Boston, form the Borough of Boston in the county of Lincolnshire, England. The local government has been arranged in this way since the reorganization of 1 April 1974, which resulted from the Local Government Act 1972. This parish forms part of the Five Villages Ward of Boston Borough Council and part of the Boston Rural Electoral Division of Lincolnshire County Council.

Hitherto, the parish had formed part of Boston Rural District, in the Parts of Holland. Holland was one of the three divisions (formally known as parts) of the traditional county of Lincolnshire. Since the Local Government Act of 1888, Holland had been in most respects, a county in itself.

Mill Lane (B1181) joins the bypass to the A17. Bicker and Donington lie either side of the South Holland and Borough of Boston boundary. The boundary follows to the south of the B1181, north of Donington Eaudike. To the west is North Kesteven on the other side of the South Forty-Foot Drain.

The boundary with South Holland at Donington follows the Old Eau to the south-east, passing the northern edge of Rabbit Hills Farm. To the south it meets the parish of Wigtoft. It passes to the west of the A17/B1181 junction at Bank House, named after the former sea bank of Bicker Haven. It follows the A17 to the west, and meets Swineshead at Bolle Hall, following the west of the A17. About  of the A17 is in the parish, including the Bicker Bar roundabout at the A52, and the Bicker Bar motel and Texaco services. The boundary with Swineshead follows to the north-west along a drain south of East Low Grounds, and includes Bicker Gauntlet. It follows North Drove to the north, along Bicker Fen, south of West Low Grounds. Near Eau End Farm (on the other side of the drain), it meets South Holland om Middle Fen then passes close to the line of the pylons on North Fen.

Community
The Ye Olde Red Lion public house is on Donington Road. The village has a post office with a shop, and a parish church dedicated to St Swithin.

North of the main line of 400 kV pylons is the Bicker Fen windfarm consisting of 13 turbines producing 26 MW (2 MW each), enough for 14,000 homes. The construction of the windfarm met some local objection. The windmills sit north from Poplartree Farm and were built in June 2008 by Wind Prospect for EdF. They are of the type REpower MM82, made in Hamburg. Bicker Fen substation is also the proposed landing site for a 1,400 MW power cable from Denmark called Viking Link, as well as the proposed offshore wind farm Triton Knoll.

Population

See also

References

External links

 Wind farm

Borough of Boston
Civil parishes in Lincolnshire
Villages in Lincolnshire
Wind farms in England